A single-serve coffee container is a method for coffee brewing that prepares only enough coffee for a single portion.

Single-serve coffee containers can both reduce the time needed to brew coffee and simplify the brewing process by eliminating the need to measure out portions, flavorings, and additives from large bulk containers.  They can also help to keep the unused product fresher by individually packaging portions separately without exposing the entire supply batch to air and light. Paper coffee pods can be functionally identical to plastic and metal coffee capsules, if the paper pods are individually sealed in separate bags. At the same time, the disposable single-use products add to the global waste production.

Variations 
Several different systems exist:

 Coffee pods or pads are pre-packaged ground coffee beans in their own filter.
 A coffee capsule differs from a coffee pod in that the coffee is packed in a plastic or aluminum package instead of a paper filter, and it is usually designed for use with a single brand or system and is therefore not interchangeable with other systems. A patent on the Nespresso system expired at the end of 2012, and there are now rival capsules available for the Nespresso system.
 A variation, coffee bags, were developed to provide the convenience of instant coffee but maintain the flavor of brewed coffee.  Modeled after tea bags, they consist of a gauze bag containing a mixture of instant coffee and finely ground roast coffee, which is to be steeped in hot water for approximately three minutes.
 Coffee (filter) disks or ground coffee filter rings are a ring-type variant of coffee bags made of coffee filter paper containing ground roast coffee for use in coffee percolators, which otherwise use permanent filters made out of metal or porcelain. One of the first companies to offer them was General Foods Corp. with their "Max-Pax" filter rings.

Comparison of systems 
The plastic and metal coffee capsules typically are used in a non-removable receptacle on the brewing device. The capsules have an outer ring or rim that stays dry during use, allowing for removal and disposal after use without getting the user's hands wet or sticky. Handling of a used moist coffee pod is not necessary if the brewing device has a removable filter tray. This tray is removed after brewing and inverted to eject the used coffee pod.

Coffee pods, bags, and capsules can be sized for individual or multi-serving portions. In food service businesses, pods and capsules used with automatic brewing can help to provide consistency of product strength and flavor for customers.

Paper coffee pods such as those used in Easy Serving Espresso Pod or Senseo machines have the benefit of being a fully biodegradable product that can decompose naturally, while plastic and metal capsules such as those used in Keurig or Nespresso machines either are not recyclable, or require additional processing to separate the plastic/metal container from the organic waste products.

Many capsule machines specifically warn the user to not disassemble the machine or put their fingers inside the capsule receptacle, as the devices commonly use sharp razor-edge tubes or prongs for piercing the coffee capsule during use.

Different single-cup systems are not interchangeable; some systems force machine owners to buy capsules from a single company (usually the patent owner), locking the machine owner into a single source of coffee. Coffee pods are made by a variety of manufacturers and are interchangeable between brand of pod and model of pod brewer most of the time.

Environmental impact
Environmental activists have said that single-use coffee pods are harmful, as they are often composed of a mix of plastic, aluminium, and organic material (the used coffee) which makes them difficult to recycle. In early 2016 the German city of Hamburg banned coffee capsules from state-run buildings on environmental grounds. There are some capsules that are plant-based and that can be compostable as bio-waste.

See also 

 Coffee service
Coffee wars

References 

 
Retail packaging